Ward-Applewhite-Thompson House is a historic plantation house located near Stantonsburg, Wilson County, North Carolina.  It was built about 1859, and is a boxy two-story, three bay, double pile, Greek Revival style frame dwelling.  It has a shallow hipped roof and wrap-around Colonial Revival style porch with Doric order columns added about 1900.  Attached to the rear of the house is a gable roofed one-story kitchen connected by a breezeway.  Also on the property are a number of contributing outbuildings including two packhouses, stable, and tobacco barns.

It was listed on the National Register of Historic Places in 1986.

References

Plantation houses in North Carolina
Houses on the National Register of Historic Places in North Carolina
Colonial Revival architecture in North Carolina
Greek Revival houses in North Carolina
Houses completed in 1859
Houses in Wilson County, North Carolina
National Register of Historic Places in Wilson County, North Carolina